Poland in the Modern era is covered in:
 History of Poland (1795–1918)
 Poland during World War I
 History of Poland (1918–1939)
 History of Poland (1939–1945)
 History of Poland (1945–1989)